Themes from S'Express - the Best Of is a compilation album by English dance music act S'Express. Released in 2004 in consists of UK and US album tracks and b-sides.

Track listing
"Theme from S'Express" (Overture) - 6:02
"Superfly Guy" - 3:31
"Hey Music Lover" - 4:30
"Mantra for a State of Mind" (Club Mix) - 8:47
"Can You Feel Me" - 4:34
"Blow Me Another Lollypop" - 3:54
"Pimps, Pushers & Prostitutes" - 5:56
"Coma II (A.M./O.K.)" - 4:56
"Nothing to Lose" - 6:45
"Find 'Em, Fool 'Em, Forget 'Em" (Wondere(s)que Mix) - 3:32
"I Like It" - 6:41
"Supersonic Lover" - 4:33
"Funky Killer" (12" Version) - 4:33
"Let it All Out" - 4:56

References

S'Express albums
2004 greatest hits albums